Postal codes in Costa Rica are five digit numeric, and were introduced in March 2013, they are associated with and identifies a unique district in the country. They are managed by the Correos de Costa Rica, a government controlled institution that provides postal service in the country. 

The first digit denotes one of the seven provinces, the second and third refer to a specific canton in the aforementioned province, and the fourth and fifth represents a specific district within the canton.

The numbers are equivalent to the codes used by the National Institute of Statistics and Census of Costa Rica and the Administrative Territorial Division to uniquely identify a district in the country.

See also 
 Districts of Costa Rica
 Administrative divisions of Costa Rica

References

Costa Rica